Mean Business is the second and final studio album by The Firm, released by Atlantic Records on 3 February 1986. Repeating the same bluesy formula as on the first album, The Firm (1985), Mean Business did not achieve the same commercial success.

One of the album's tracks, "Live in Peace", was first recorded on Paul Rodgers' first solo album in 1983, Cut Loose. The versions differ in that Chris Slade played the drums at half tempo compared to the original version, apart from the ending. Paul Rodgers has recently played a new version on his new compilation album Live in Peace.

The album's title was intended to have a double meaning: that the music business is a hard one, and that the band was serious about its music ("The Firm mean business"). However, perhaps due to the lukewarm-at-best critical and financial success which the band met, Page and Rodgers decided to disband The Firm within months of this album's release.

The album peaked at #22 on the Billboard 200 albums chart. and at #46 on the UK Albums Chart. The single "All the King's Horses" spent four weeks at the top of Billboards Mainstream Rock Tracks chart.

"Fortune Hunter" was originally co-written by Page and Chris Squire for the aborted XYZ project in 1981. Squire was not credited on The Firm's version.

Track listing

Personnel

Band 
 Paul Rodgers – vocals, acoustic and electric guitars, piano, producer
 Jimmy Page – acoustic and electric guitars, producer
 Tony Franklin – fretless bass, keyboards, synthesizer, rhythm guitar on Dreaming,  back vocals
 Chris Slade – drums and percussion

Other 
 Julian Mendelsohn – producer
 Aubrey Powell Productions – cover design
 Barry Diament – mastering

Charts

Album

Singles

References 

The Firm (rock band) albums
1986 albums
Albums produced by Jimmy Page
Atlantic Records albums
Albums produced by Julian Mendelsohn